Ismael Khaled (Arabic :إسماعيل خالد) (born 15 June 1997) is an Emirati footballer who plays for Emirates on loan from Shabab Al-Ahli as a left back, most recently for Shabab Al-Ahli.

References

External links
 

Emirati footballers
1997 births
Living people
Al Shabab Al Arabi Club Dubai players
Shabab Al-Ahli Club players
Emirates Club players
UAE Pro League players
Association football fullbacks
Footballers at the 2018 Asian Games
Asian Games bronze medalists for the United Arab Emirates
Asian Games medalists in football
Medalists at the 2018 Asian Games